Chornyi Ostriv  is a village in Stryi Raion, Lviv Oblast, Ukraine. The village has approximately 1,300 inhabitants.

There is a railway stop, located nearby on the Lviv-Chernivtsi line.

In the Second Polish Republic, the town was the seat of the rural commune of Ostrów in the Bóbre County (Lviv Province).

Villages in Stryi Raion